Rawlco Radio Ltd. is a media company based in Saskatoon, Saskatchewan, Canada. The company is the sole proprietor of seven radio stations in the provinces of Alberta and Saskatchewan.

The Rawlco Radio Corporate Office is just south of Downtown Saskatoon, overlooking the South Saskatchewan River, at 715 Saskatchewan Crescent West. This complex also is home to their local stations; CKOM, CFMC and CJDJ.

History

Started in 1946 by Edward Rawlinson (1912–1992), a Saskatchewan resident born in Qu'Appelle, it became one of Canada's most successful broadcasting companies. Rawlinson had a fascination for radio broadcasting, and in 1946 he purchased CKBI radio in Prince Albert, Saskatchewan, and soon after became chairman of his own company, Rawlco Communications. The company went on to acquire prominent radio and television stations in Prince Albert, North Battleford, Meadow Lake, Saskatoon, Regina, Edmonton and Calgary.

In 1975, Rawlinson's two sons, Gordon and Doug, both from Prince Albert, entered the business. The Rawlinson brothers formed Rawlco Radio, a Saskatchewan-based radio broadcasting company. During the next twenty years, Rawlco Radio purchased and operated radio stations in Saskatchewan, Alberta, and Ontario. In partnership with Maclean-Hunter, Rawlco was also part of the original consortium licensed to launch NCN, a Canadian country music video channel which was later renamed CMT.

In 1999, they consolidated holdings to focus only on Saskatchewan and  Alberta radio. It currently operates seven stations in the provinces.

Ed Rawlinson died in 1992, and his son Gordon is now  CEO of Rawlco Radio.

On July 10, 2014, Rawlco announced that it would sell its radio station clusters in  Edmonton (CKNO-FM and CIUP-FM), North Battleford/Meadow Lake (CJNB, CJCQ-FM, CJHD-FM and CJNS-FM), and Prince Albert (CKBI, CFMM-FM, and CHQX-FM) to The Jim Pattison Group.

Radio stations

Alberta
 Calgary, Alberta - CHUP-FM

Saskatchewan
 Regina - CIZL-FM, CJME, CKCK-FM
 Saskatoon - CFMC-FM, CJDJ-FM, CKOM

Former 
 Calgary, Alberta - CFFR, CJAQ-FM
 Edmonton, Alberta - CIUP-FM, CKNO-FM
 Prince Albert - CFMM-FM, CHQX-FM, CKBI
 Meadow Lake - CJNS-FM
 Ottawa, Ontario - CFGO, CJMJ-FM
 North Battleford - CJCQ-FM, CJNB, CJHD-FM

References

External links
Rawlco Communications
History of Ralwco Radio Inc. - Canadian Communications Foundation

Companies based in Saskatoon
Radio broadcasting companies of Canada